"Tous les garçons et les filles" (English: "All the Boys and Girls") is a song by French singer-songwriter Françoise Hardy, with Roger Samyn credited as co-writer on Hardy's original 1962 yé-yé-era recording. The song recounts the feelings of a young person who has never known love and her envy of the couples that surround her. Hardy's single, released internationally, was a massive hit in France, where it spent 15 non-consecutive weeks at number one (four separate runs) between late October 1962 and mid-April 1963.

Background

Hardy performed the song in a telecast on the evening of Sunday 28 October 1962 in a musical interlude during the results of the 1962 referendum to allow direct election of the president of the French Republic. The record quickly became a success, selling 500,000 copies by the end of the year. In Italy Italian version sold 255,000 while French version sold 140,000 copies. Additionally, it is quoted several times by the main characters in J.L. Carr's 1988 novel What Hetty Did.

Françoise Hardy also recorded the song in English ("Find Me a Boy", 1964), Italian ("Quelli della mia età", 1962; collected in Françoise Hardy canta per voi in italiano, 1963), and German ("Peter und Lou", 1963; collected in In Deutschland, 1965.)

Jimmy Page participated in the recording session as a session musician.

EP track list

SP track listing

Cover versions 
The song has been covered by many artists in many languages, including: 
 Lill-Babs (in Swedish, "Vart Jag Än Går", 1963)
 Sophie Blaede (1962)
 Ginette Reno (1962)
 Catherine Spaak (1962)
 Aimable (on the accordion, 1963)
 Steve Perry (in English, "Find Me a Girl", 1963)
 Eny Mara (in Portuguese, "A Idade Do Amor", 1964)
Maurice Chevalier (as "Mes Chers Zazas", with new lyrics by Edmond Meunier, 1965)
 Dulce Salles Cunha Braga (1965)
 Mia Frye (in English, "All the Girls and Boys", 1984)
 Eurythmics (bonus track on the album Be Yourself Tonight and, in some countries, B-side of the single "It's Alright - (Baby's Coming Back)"); sung in French by Annie Lennox
 The Paquitas (accompanists of Xuxa) (in Portuguese, "Alguem para amar", 1991)
 Janusz Laskowski (in Polish, "Och jak bardzo cię kocham", album Nigdy nie byłem w Casablance, 1994)
 Laurent Voulzy and Carla Bruni singing with the Enfoirés (album Les Enfoirés à l'Opéra comique, 1995)
 Marie Myriam (1996)
 Gigliola Cinquetti ("Quelli della mia età", 1999)
 Saint Etienne ("Find Me a Boy", album The Misadventures of Saint Etienne, music for the film Les Folies de Margaret (The Misadventures of Margaret), released in Japan in 1999)
 The Dresden Dolls
 Thanh Lan in French and Vietnamese
 Zona Zul (album Beira, 2006)
 Cœur de pirate
 Elastic No-No Band (2007 live recording, released in 2012 compilation Not Like Most Folkies, Part 2: Early Covers)
 Raymond & Maria - released in single Ingen vill veta var du köpt din tröja
 Pomme (Live for Sourdoreille in 2019)

Movie soundtracks

"Tous les garçons et les filles" 
 Metroland, United Kingdom, 1997
CD, Metroland, Warner Bros. Records, 1998 (UK).
 The Dreamers (Innocents: The Dreamers), France, Italy, United Kingdom, 2003
 CD, The Dreamers, Universal Records (9812084), 2003 (UK)
 The Statement (Crime contre l’humanité), Canada, France, United Kingdom, 2003
 Se devo essere sincera, Italy, 2004
 Attenberg, Greece, 2011

"Find Me a Boy" 
 The Misadventures of Margaret, United Kingdom, 1998
 Performed by Françoise Hardy and performed by Saint Etienne

-All These Sleepless Nights-

References 

Françoise Hardy songs
Eurythmics songs
Cœur de pirate songs
1962 singles
1985 singles
1962 songs
Songs written by Françoise Hardy